Csanádapáca is a village in Békés County, in the Southern Great Plain region of south-east Hungary.

In the 19th and 20th centuries, a small Jewish community lived in the village, in 1880 85 Jews lived in the village, most of whom were murdered in the Holocaust.

Geography

References

Populated places in Békés County
Jewish communities destroyed in the Holocaust